The Williams Family Farm, in Carroll County, Georgia near Villa Rica, Georgia, was built in 1891.  It has also been known as the Goldworth Farm. It was listed on the National Register of Historic Places in 2005.  The listing included seven contributing buildings, six contributing structures, 11 contributing sites, and a contributing object.

In 2005 it was a farm complex with a Folk Victorian-style main house built in 1891, a number of outbuildings, and an extant landscape. It includes an 1891 smokehouse, an 1891 horse barn, and a brick creamery from 1895.

It is located at 55 Goldworth Rd., southwest of Villa Rica, on an old alignment of the unpaved-in-2005 Villa Rica-Carrollton Road, which was bypassed by Georgia Highway 61.

References

Farms in Georgia (U.S. state)
National Register of Historic Places in Carroll County, Georgia
Buildings and structures completed in 1891